October is an academic journal specializing in contemporary art, criticism, and theory, published by MIT Press.

History
October was established in 1976 in New York by Rosalind E. Krauss and Annette Michelson, who left Artforum to do so. The founders of the journal were originally known as "Octoberists". Its name is a reference to the Eisenstein film that set the tone of intellectual, politically engaged writing that has been the hallmark of the journal. The journal was a participant in introducing French post-structural theory on the English-speaking academic scene. According to The Art Story, Krauss used the journal "as a way to publish essays on her emergent ideas on post-structuralist art theory, Deconstructionist theory, psychoanalysis, postmodernism and feminism". Jeremy Gilbert-Rolfe, one of the co-founders of the journal, withdrew after only a few issues, and by the spring of 1977, Douglas Crimp joined the editorial team. In 1990, after Crimp left the journal, Krauss and Michelson were joined by Yve-Alain Bois, Hal Foster, Benjamin H. D. Buchloh, Denis Hollier, and John Rajchman.

Contents
As well as in-depth articles and reviews of 20th century and contemporary art, the journal features critical interpretations of cinema and popular culture from a progressive viewpoint.

Impact
According to Encyclopædia Britannica, the journal was an "influential vehicle for the debate surrounding the emergence of postmodernism and New Historicism in 20th-century art-historical studies", and the journal "contributed greatly to Anglo-American academics’ adoption of French theoretical innovations, especially those pertaining to the analysis of cinema". The Art Story describes the journal as "significant for revisiting and stressing the historical importance of early modes of 20th-century avant-garde art, such as Cubism, Surrealism and Expressionism".

Collections
MIT Press has released two anthologies of articles and a book series.

References

External links
 

Arts journals
Film studies journals
MIT Press academic journals
English-language journals
Publications established in 1976
Quarterly journals
Contemporary art magazines